The canton of La Vallée de la Têt is an administrative division of the Pyrénées-Orientales department, in southern France. It was created at the French canton reorganisation which came into effect in March 2015. Its seat is in Le Soler.

It consists of the following communes: 
  
Corbère
Corbère-les-Cabanes
Corneilla-la-Rivière
Ille-sur-Têt
Millas
Montalba-le-Château
Néfiach
Saint-Féliu-d'Amont
Saint-Féliu-d'Avall
Le Soler

References

Cantons of Pyrénées-Orientales